Wen Yongjun (born 23 May 2003) is a Chinese footballer currently playing as a winger or full-back for Guangzhou R&F.

Club career
Wen Yongjun was promoted to the senior team of Guangzhou R&F within the 2020 Chinese Super League season and would make his debut in a league game on 26 July 2020 against Shenzhen F.C. in a 3-0 defeat.

Career statistics

References

External links

2003 births
Living people
Chinese footballers
Association football midfielders
Chinese Super League players
Guangzhou City F.C. players